Karimpur may refer to:

Karimpur – a town in West Bengal, India
Karimpur I – a town quarter in Karimpur
Karimpur II – a town quarter in Karimpur
Karimpur (Vidhan Sabha constituency) – an assembly constituency in the Indian state of West Bengal
Karimpur, Bangladesh – a village and union council in Bangladesh
Karimpur, Ludhiana – a village in Punjab, India
Karimpur, SBS Nagar – a village in Punjab, India

See also 

 Karimpura